de Villiers is a common French and Afrikaans surname. It may refer to:
De Villiers (playwright) (c. 1600–1681), French playwright and actor
AB de Villiers, a former South African international cricketer
De Villiers Graaff, a former South African politician
CJ de Villiers, a former South African cricketer
Fanie de Villiers, a former South African cricketer
Gerard de Villiers, a French writer of spy stories
Giniel de Villiers, a South African racing driver
HO de Villiers, a former South African rugby union player
Jackie de Villiers (1894–1960), South African judge
Jacob de Villiers (1868–1932), judge and Chief Justice of South Africa
Jean de Villiers, a former South African international rugby union player
Jan-Izak de Villiers, a former Namibia cricket and hockey international player
Johan Zulch de Villiers (1845–1910), South African politician
John de Villiers (1842–1914), Cape lawyer, judge and Chief Justice of South Africa
Izak Louis de Villiers, a former South African theologian and author
Juan de Villiers, a former South African cricketer
Louis de Villiers (1908–1970), South African cricketer
 (1885–1977), South African clergyman and composer
Nannie de Villiers, a South African tennis player
Peggy de Villiers (born 1993), a South African deaf swimmer
Peter de Villiers, a South African rugby union coach named in 2008 as the head coach of the country's national team, the Springboks
Philippe de Villiers, a French politician
Pieter de Villiers, a South African hurdler
Pieter de Villiers, a South African-born French international rugby union player
Ryan de Villiers (born 1992), South African actor

See also 
 Villiers (disambiguation)

Further reading

Surnames of French origin
French-language surnames
Afrikaans-language surnames
French toponymic surnames